The 2017–18 Coupe de France was the 101st season of the most prestigious football cup competition of France. The competition was organised by the French Football Federation (FFF) and was open to all clubs in French football, as well as clubs from the overseas departments and territories (Guadeloupe, French Guiana, Martinique, Mayotte, New Caledonia (winner of 2017 New Caledonia Cup), Tahiti (winner of 2017 Tahiti Cup), Réunion, and Saint Martin).

Paris Saint-Germain were the defending champions, and won their 4th consecutive final and record 12th title overall with a 2–0 win over Les Herbiers VF in the final.

Teams

Round 1 to 6

The first six rounds, and any preliminaries, are organised by the Regional Leagues and the Overseas Territories, who allow teams from within their league structure to enter at any point up to the third round. Teams from Championnat National 3 enter at the third round, those from Championnat National 2 enter at the fourth round and those from Championnat National enter at the fifth round.

Round 7
The 145 qualifiers from the 6th round of the Regional Leagues are joined by the 11 qualifiers from the Overseas Territories and the 20 teams from Ligue 2.

Ligue 2

 Ajaccio
 Auxerre
 Bourg-en-Bresse
 Brest
 Châteauroux
 Clermont
 Gazélec Ajaccio
 Le Havre
 Lens
 Lorient

 Nancy
 Nîmes
 Niort
 Orléans
 Paris FC
 Quevilly-Rouen
 Reims
 Sochaux
 Tours
 Valenciennes

Regional Leagues
Figures in parenthesis indicate the tier of the French football league system the team play at.

Nouvelle-Aquitaine: 12 teams
 Bergerac Périgord FC (4)
 Stade Bordelais (4)
 Limoges FC (4)
 Angoulême CFC (5)
 Aviron Bayonnais FC (5)
 FC Bressuire (5)
 CS Feytiat (5)
 FCE Mérignac Arlac (5)
 La Brède FC (6)
 Langon FC (6)
 Stade Ygossais (8)
 FC Pays Argentonnais (10)

Pays de la Loire: 11 teams
 SO Cholet (3)
 Stade Lavallois (3)
 Les Herbiers VF (3)
 Le Mans FC (4)
 US Changé (5)
 Ancienne Château-Gontier (6)
 TVEC Les Sables-d'Olonne (6)
 JSC Bellevue Nantes (6)
 Olympique Saumur FC (6)
 AC Chapelain Foot (7)
 FC Essartais (7)

Corsica: 2 teams
 AS Furiani-Agliani (4)
 GC Lucciana (5)

Grand Est: 20 teams
 SAS Épinal (4)
 US Raon-l'Étape (4)
 FC Saint-Louis Neuweg (4)
 SC Schiltigheim (4)
 CSO Amnéville (5)
 ASC Biesheim (5)
 RC Épernay Champagne (5)
 FCSR Haguenau (5)
 FC Mulhouse (5)
 FC Trémery (5)
 Chaumont FC (6)
 US Forbach (6)
 FC Hégenheim (6)
 Étoile Naborienne St Avold (6)
 ES Thaon (6)
 FCA Troyes (6)
 FC Geispolsheim 01 (7)
 US Ittenheim (8)
 UL Rombas (8)
 FC Still 1930 (8)

Centre-Val de Loire: 4 teams
 FC Chartres (4)
 SO Romorantin (4)
 Avoine OCC (5)
 Vierzon FC (5)

Bourgogne-Franche-Comté: 8 teams
 ASM Belfort (4)
 CO Avallon (5)
 FC Gueugnon (5)
 CA Pontarlier (5)
 FC Grandvillars (6)
 FC Morteau-Montlebon (6)
 Sud Nivernais Imphy Decize (6)
 FC 4 Rivières 70 (7)

Hauts-de-France: 20 teams
 US Boulogne (3)
 FC Chambly (3)
 USL Dunkerque (3)
 Arras FA (4)
 AS Beauvais Oise (4)
 Feignies Aulnoye FC (5)
 Saint-Amand FC (5)
 USM Senlisienne (5)
 AC Cambrai (6)
 US Chantilly (6)
 US Choisy-au-Bac (6)
 AFC Compiègne (6)
 SC Hazebrouck (6)
 Entente Itancourt-Neuville (6)
 Olympique Marcquois (6)
 US Vimy (6)
 FC Porto Portugais Amiens (7)
 OS Fives (7)
 US Nœux-les-Mines (7)
 FC Quarouble (9)

Occitanie: 11 teams
 Rodez AF (3)
 US Colomiers Football (4)
 Tarbes Pyrénées Football (4)
 Olympique Alès (5)
 Balma SC (5)
 Canet Roussillon FC (5)
 AS Fabrègues (5)
 FC Alberes Argelès (6)
 SC Anduzien (7)
 Montauban FCTG (7)
 AS Tournefeuille (7)

Normandy: 8 teams
 US Avranches (3)
 US Granville (4)
 Évreux FC 27 (5)
 FC Rouen (5)
 FC Saint-Lô Manche (5)
 LC Bretteville-sur-Odon (6)
 ASPTT Caen (6)
 AF Virois (6)

Méditerranée: 5 teams
 Marseille Consolat (3)
 FC Martigues (4)
 AS Gémenos (5)
 US Marseille Endoume (5)
 AS Cagnes-Le Cros (7)

Brittany: 14 teams
 US Concarneau (3)
 Stade Briochin (4)
 US Saint-Malo (4)
 AS Vitré (4)
 Saint-Colomban Sportive Locminé (5)
 Vannes OC (5)
 Stade Pontivyen (6)
 Stella Maris Douarnenez (7)
 FC Quimperlois (7)
 Plancoët-Arguenon FC (7)
 CS Plédran (7)
 US Liffré (8)
 AS Plomelin (8)
 Séné FC (8)

Paris-Île-de-France: 11 teams
 L'Entente SSG (3)
 FC Fleury 91 (4)
 US Lusitanos Saint-Maur (4)
 FCM Aubervilliers (5)
 Blanc Mesnil SF (5)
 Racing Colombes 92 (5)
 CO Les Ulis (5)
 US Rungis (6)
 St Brice FC (6)
 AC Houilles (8)
 ASC La Courneuve (10)

Auvergne-Rhône-Alpes: 19 teams
 AS Lyon-Duchère (3)
 Grenoble Foot 38 (3)
 ASF Andrézieux (4)
 Annecy FC (4)
 Le Puy Foot 43 Auvergne (4)
 FC Villefranche (4)
 AS Yzeure (4)
 FC Chamalières (5)
 Cluses-Scionzier FC (6)
 Hauts Lyonnais (6)
 AS Bron Grand Lyon (7)
 US Feurs (7)
 FC La Tour-St Clair (7)
 AC Seyssinet (7)
 AS Sud Ardèche (7)
 ES Tarentaise (7)
 FC Vallée de la Gresse (7)
 FC Valdaine (8)
 Football Mont-Pilat (9)

Overseas Territories teams

 French Guiana: 2 teams
 ASE Matoury (R1)
 ASC Le Geldar (R1)

 Martinique: 2 teams
 Club Colonial (R1)
 Golden Lion FC (R1)

 Guadeloupe: 2 teams
 L'Etoile de Morne-à-l'Eau (R1)
 CS Moulien (R1)

 Réunion: 2 teams
 AS Excelsior (R1)
 AJ Petite-Île (R1)

 Mayotte: 1 team
 Diables Noirs (DH)

 New Caledonia: 1 team
 AS Lössi

 Tahiti: 1 team
 A.S. Tefana

Seventh round
The draw for the seventh round is made in two parts. First the Overseas teams are drawn against opponents from the French League structure who have applied to potentially travel overseas. Those French teams not drawn in this part are re-entered into the main draw.

The draw for the overseas teams took place on 25 October 2017. The main draw for the seventh round took place on 26 October 2017.

Ties took place on 10, 11 and 12 November 2017, with matches postponed from those dates being rescheduled for 18 and 19 November.

Ties involving overseas teams

Main draw
The main draw was split into 10 regional groups, with the split primarily ensuring an equal distribution of clubs from the different tiers, and secondarily grouping by geography.

Group 7A

Group 7B

Group 7C

Group 7D

Group 7E

Group 7F

Group 7G

Group 7H

Group 7I

Group 7J

Eighth round 
The draw for the eighth round took place on 14 November 2017. Because AS Excelsior (R1)  won their seventh round tie in mainland France, they are guaranteed a home tie in the eighth round, against one of the opponents from the French League structure who applied to potentially travel overseas.

Games were played on 1, 2, 3, 9 and 10 December 2017.

Overseas draw

Main draw
The main draw was split into 6 groups, with the split primarily ensuring an equal distribution of clubs from the different tiers, and secondarily grouping by geography.

Group 8A

Group 8B

Group 8C

Group 8D

Group 8E

Group 8F

Round of 64 
The draw for the ninth round (known as the round of 64) took place on 14 December 2017. The 20 Ligue 1 teams join the draw at this stage. The draw is split into four groups to ensure equal distribution of teams from each tier, with geographical proximity a secondary factor.

The lowest ranked teams remaining in the competition at this stage were AC Houilles and FC Still 1930, both from tier 8 (Regional 3). FC Still 1930 entered the competition at the first round, and are the longest standing team still in the competition.

Games were played on 6, 7 and 8 January 2018.

Group 9A

Group 9B

Group 9C

Group 9D

Round of 32
The draw for the tenth round (known as the round of 32) took place on 8 January 2018. This was an open draw.

The lowest ranked teams remaining in the competition at this stage were Canet Roussillon FC, FC Saint-Lô Manche and ASC Biesheim, all from tier 5 (Championnat National 3).

Games were played on 23, 24 and 25 January 2018.

Round of 16
The draw for the eleventh round (known as the round of 16) took place on 25 January 2018. This was an open draw.

The lowest ranked team remaining in the competition at this stage was US Granville, from tier 4 (Championnat National 2).

Games were played on 6, 7 and 8 February 2018.

Quarter-finals
The draw for the quarter-finals took place on 8 February 2018. This was an open draw.

The lowest ranked teams remaining in the competition at this stage were FC Chambly and Les Herbiers VF, both from tier 3 (Championnat National).

Games were played on 27 and 28 February and 1 March 2018.

Semi-finals
The draw for the semi-finals took place on 1 March 2018. This was an open draw.

The lowest ranked teams remaining in the competition at this stage were still FC Chambly and Les Herbiers VF, both from tier 3 (Championnat National).

Games were played on 17 and 18 April 2018.

Final

References

External links

 
France
Cup
Coupe de France seasons